André Alphonse Toussaint Wormser (1 November 1851 – 4 November 1926) was a French Romantic composer.

Life and career
André Wormser was born in Paris and studied with Antoine Marmontel and François Bazin at the Paris Conservatoire. As a very wealthy man, Wormser was able to afford a membership in the social club Cercle artistique et littéraire.

In 1872 Wormser won the Premier Prix in piano at the Paris Conservatoire, and in 1875 he won the Prix de Rome for his cantata Clytemnestre. He is best known for the pantomime L'Enfant prodigue (1890), which was revived at the Booth Theater in New York in 1916 as the three-act play Perroit the Prodigal. He died in Paris.

Notable students include Charles Malherbe.

Works

Wormser composed choral and orchestra music, opera and works for solo instrument and voice. Selected works include:

L'Étoile, Ballet-pantomime en deux actes (31 May 1897, chor. Joseph Hansen, Paris Opera)
Ballada for Oboe and Piano (1909)
Clytemnestre, cantata (1897)
L'Enfant prodigue, pantomime (1916)
Rêverie (Gypsy Suite) for violin and piano
Adèle de Ponthieu, opera (1887)
Rivoli, opera (1896)

References

External links
 
 
 
 André Wormser : Romance sans paroles, #4 from '6 Pieces Pittoresques' from YouTube

1851 births
1926 deaths
19th-century classical composers
20th-century classical composers
Conservatoire de Paris alumni
French bankers
French male classical composers
French opera composers
Male opera composers
Prix de Rome for composition
Pupils of Antoine François Marmontel
French Romantic composers
19th-century French composers
20th-century French composers
20th-century French male musicians
19th-century French male musicians